Richard Dermer (June 19, 1939March 14, 2014) was an American restaurateur and founder of Hideaway Pizza.

Dermer was born in Stillwater, Oklahoma in 1939. He attended and graduated at Oklahoma State University. While attending university, in 1957 Dermer opened the original Hideaway Pizza outlet, in Stillwater; it was the second pizzeria in the city. Subsequently, Dermer opened a second Hideaway Pizza outlet in Tulsa, Oklahoma, and the business expanded from there.

He was an enthusiast for kite flying. He was nicknamed "The Big Kahuna". He died in hospital as the result of complications from previous health issues, aged 74.

References

1939 births
2014 deaths
Oklahoma State University alumni
Businesspeople from Oklahoma
American restaurateurs
American company founders
People from Stillwater, Oklahoma
20th-century American businesspeople